XNA or xna may refer to:

 Microsoft XNA, a toolset for game developers from Microsoft
 Northwest Arkansas National Airport (IATA code)
 Old North Arabian (ISO 639-3 language code: xna)
 X-No-Archive, a Usenet newsgroup header
 Xeno nucleic acid, artificial genetic material alternative to DNA
 Xinhua News Agency, the official state-run press agency of the People's Republic of China